Jacob Pieter Pompejus, Baron van Zuylen van Nijevelt (29 June 1816 – 4 November 1890) was a Dutch politician who served as Minister of Foreign Affairs of the Netherlands from 1852 to 1853, and again in 1861. During his second term as minister, he was also the chairman of the Council of Ministers, an office now known as Prime Minister.

Later, he was representative of the Netherlands in Paris.

See also
List of Dutch politicians

References

1816 births
1890 deaths
Prime Ministers of the Netherlands
Ministers of Foreign Affairs of the Netherlands
Ministers of State (Netherlands)
Independent politicians in the Netherlands
Dutch members of the Dutch Reformed Church
People from Dordrecht
Barons of the Netherlands